Perixera obliviaria is a species of moth of the  family Geometridae. It is found from the Indo-Australian tropics east to Queensland and Fiji.

The wingspan is about 30 mm. The wings are dull pale brown, the hindwings with a small pale discal spot ringed darker brown to black.

The larvae feed on Derris species. They are a pest in Citrus orchards. They attack the rind of the developing fruit of their host plant.

References

Moths described in 1861
Perixera
Moths of Japan